Manasse Mbonye is a theoretical astrophysicist born in Gahini, Rwanda. He is currently Executive Secretary of the National Council for Science and Technology in Kigali.

Early life and education

Mbonye's parents (Reuben Rwabuzisoni, father) were teachers. His high school education was at Nyakasura School in Uganda. He attended Fourah Bay College in Sierra Leone, then obtained his doctoral degree from the University of Connecticut in 1996. His Ph.D. dissertation on “Gravitational Perturbations of Radiating Spacetimes” along with his founding of and activities in the “Rwanda Education Reconstruction Effort” (RERE) earned him the 1996 Ph.D. "Graduate of the Year" at the University of Connecticut.

Research

Mbonye held a postdoctoral position at the University of Michigan and was a professor at the Rochester Institute of Technology until 2011. He also carried out research at the NASA Goddard Space Flight Center in Greenbelt, Maryland as a National Research Council Senior Research Associate.

Mbonye has made important contributions to theoretical physics, including the Mbonye-Kazanas model of non-singular black holes, cosmology with interacting dark energy, and models for the origin of the M–sigma relation.

Mbonye is currently Vice-Rector in Charge of Academic Affairs at the National University of Rwanda, and RIT-NUR Research Professor at the Rochester Institute of Technology.

References

Year of birth missing (living people)
Living people
21st-century astronomers
Fourah Bay College alumni
Rochester Institute of Technology faculty
Academic staff of the National University of Rwanda
University of Connecticut alumni
University of Michigan faculty
People from Eastern Province, Rwanda